Gonzague Truc (15 November 1877 – 1 June 1972) was a French literary critic, essayist, and biographer.

Truc was born at Flayosc, Var. A frequent contributor to the Revue Philosophique, he was a Thomist who sympathised with Charles Maurras and the Action Française. He latterly lived in Paris.

Works 
 Le quartier St-Victor et le jardin des plantes, Paris, Éditions Firmin-Didot, 1930
 Le Roman de la violette de Gerbert de Montreuil, renouvelé par Gonzague Truc, Paris, éd. d'art H. Piazza, 1931
 Introduction à la lecture de René Boylesve, Paris, Le Divan, série-collection « Le Souvenir de René Boylesve », 1932
 Les pages immortelles de Spinoza (choisies et expliquées par Gonzague Truc), Paris, Éditions Corrêa, 1940
 Madame Colette, Paris, Éditions Corrêa, 1941
 Histoire de la Philosophie, Paris, Éditions Fischbacher, 1950
 Histoire de la Littérature Catholique Contemporaine, Casterman, 1961, Prix Broquette-Gonin (littérature)

Sources
 Henry Coston, Dictionnaire de la politique française. Vol 2 (1972)

External links

People from Var (department)
1877 births
1972 deaths
French literary critics
French essayists
20th-century French non-fiction writers
Winners of the Prix Broquette-Gonin (literature)